The Freedom Camping Act is an Act of Parliament passed into law in New Zealand in 2011 that allows local authorities to pass bylaws that permit or prohibit freedom camping in specific areas. In 2011 the Minister for the Environment Nick Smith announced that the government will introduce a Freedom Camping Bill into Parliament with the intention that the law will be in place before the Rugby World Cup.

See also
 Camping in New Zealand

References

External links
 Text of the Act
Freedom camping at the Department of Conservation

Statutes of New Zealand
2011 in New Zealand law
Camping in New Zealand